Srah Srang ("Royal Bath") is a baray or reservoir at Angkor, Cambodia, located south of the East Baray and east of Banteay Kdei.

History
Sras Srang was dug in the mid-10th century, by initiative of Kavindrarimathana, Buddhist minister of Rajendravarman II. It was modified around the year 1200 by Jayavarman VII, who added the laterite landing-stage at its western side, probably because the East Baray had been overwhelmed by sediment and had begun malfunctioning.

French archeological expeditions have found a necropolis close to it.

The site
At present Srah Srang measures 700 by 350 m and is still partially flooded. As other barays, maybe there was a temple standing on an artificial island in the middle of it, as suggested by finding of a basement. The landing-stage, opposite the entrance to Banteay Kdei, is a popular site for viewing the sunrise. It is cruciform, flanked by nāga balustrades which end with the upright head of a serpent, mounted by a garuda with its wings unfurled. The steps that lead down to the water are flanked by two guardian lions.

A 1600 sq. meter cemetery was discovered at the north-west corner of the reservoir.  Mortuary jars containing cremated remains and other artifacts dating from the reign of Udayadityavarman II were excavated by B.P. Groslier.

Notes

References 
 Dumarçay, Jacques et al. Cambodian Architecture, Eight to Thirteenth Century. 2001. .
 Freeman, Michael. Jacques, Claude. Ancient Angkor. River Books 2006. .

External links 
 Photos of Srah Srang by M.A.Sullivan on Bluffton University website

Angkorian sites in Siem Reap Province